Tian'e is a county of northwestern Guangxi, China, located on the upper reaches of the Hongshui River and bordering Guizhou province to the northwest. It is under the administration of the prefecture-level city of Hechi.

Administrative divisions
There are 2 towns, 6 townships and 1 ethnic township in the county:

Towns:
Liupai (六排镇), Xiangyang (向阳镇)

Townships:
Bamu Township (岜暮乡), Nazhi Township (纳直乡), Gengxin Township (更新乡), Xialao Township (下老乡), Pojie Township (坡结乡), Sanbao Township (三堡乡), Bala Yao Ethnic Township (八腊瑶族乡)

Transport and infrastructure
 Longtan Dam on the Hongshui River.

Biodiversity
Sinocyclocheilus furcodorsalis is a species of cave fish that is only known from an underground stream in Tian'e County.

Climate

References

 
Counties of Guangxi
Administrative divisions of Hechi